Robert H. Hayes is an American academic. He is the Emeritus Philip Caldwell Professor of Business Administration at the Harvard Business School.

Early life
Robert H. Hayes received a PhD from Stanford University in 1966.

Career
Hayes worked for IBM and McKinsey & Company.

He became a professor at the Harvard Business School, eventually receiving the Philip Caldwell chair in business administration. He worked with William J. Abernathy. Professor Wickham Skinner was one of their mentors.

Hayes served as the president of the Production & Operations Management Society. He serves on the board of directors of the American Productivity & Quality Center.

See also 

 Hayes-Wheelwright matrix

References

Archives and records
Robert H. Hayes papers at Baker Library Special Collections, Harvard Business School.

Living people
Stanford University alumni
Harvard Business School faculty
American business theorists
Year of birth missing (living people)